Epps is a village in West Carroll Parish, Louisiana, United States. The population was 854 at the 2010 census.

The Poverty Point National Monument, the most complex earthworks site built by a late Archaic culture, is located to the east of Epps.

Geography
Epps is located at  (32.602656, -91.476990).

Demographics

As of the census of 2000, there were 1,153 people, 209 households, and 156 families residing in the village. The racial makeup of the village was 36.17% White, 63.05% African American, 0.09% Asian, and 0.69% from two or more races. Hispanic or Latino of any race were 1.30% of the population.

There were 209 households, out of which 37.8% had children under the age of 18 living with them, 48.8% were married couples living together, 21.5% had a female householder with no husband present, and 24.9% were non-families. 23.0% of all households were made up of individuals, and 13.4% had someone living alone who was 65 years of age or older. The average household size was 2.89 and the average family size was 3.41.

In the village, the population was spread out, with 17.4% under the age of 18, 22.3% from 18 to 24, 40.5% from 25 to 44, 14.0% from 45 to 64, and 5.8% who were 65 years of age or older. The median age was 30 years. For every 100 females there were 268.4 males. For every 100 females age 18 and over, there were 338.7 males.

The median income for a household in the village was $20,956, and the median income for a family was $23,125. Males had a median income of $20,000 versus $15,804 for females. The per capita income for the village was $6,486. About 29.7% of families and 38.3% of the population were below the poverty line, including 50.8% of those under age 18 and 48.5% of those age 65 or over.

Education
Public schools are operated by the West Carroll Parish School Board. The village of Epps is zoned to Epps High School (Gra  des PK-12).

Notable people
Jake Jones, a major league baseball player from 1941 to 1948, was born in Epps.

References

External links
 Epps Progress Community Progress Site for Epps, Louisiana

Villages in West Carroll Parish, Louisiana